Abergwili railway station served the village of Abergwili in Wales. It was the first station after Gwili Junction, the point where the line through it divided from the Carmarthen to Aberystwyth Line.

History

Opened by the Llanelly Railway, the station was  absorbed into the London and North Western Railway as part of its ownership of the Central Wales Line. Becoming part of the London, Midland and Scottish Railway during the Grouping of 1923, it passed on to the London Midland Region of British Railways on nationalisation in 1948. Later transferred to the Western Region of British Railways, it was closed by the British Railways Board.

The site today

The station site remained undeveloped after closure and the platform survived until 1999 when the trackbed was used for the upgrading of the A40 trunk road as part of Carmarthen's eastern bypass. Nothing now remains as the trackbed has been subsumed beneath the new road scheme.

References 

 Llandeilo to Abergwili Line 
 Abergwili station on navigable O. S. map

External links
 Railscot Carmarthen Branch (Llanelly Railway and Dock Company)

Disused railway stations in Carmarthenshire
Former London and North Western Railway stations
Railway stations in Great Britain opened in 1865
Railway stations in Great Britain closed in 1963
1865 establishments in Wales
1963 disestablishments in Wales